Volusianus was the Roman emperor from 251 to 253.

Volusianus or Volusian may also refer to:

Gaius Ceionius Rufius Volusianus (c. 246 – c. 330), Roman senator
Lucius Petronius Taurus Volusianus (d. c. 286), Roman senator
Gaius Ceionius Rufius Volusianus Lampadius (fl. 365), Roman urban prefect
Rufius Antonius Agrypnius Volusianus (d. 437), Roman aristocrat 
Volusianus of Trier, bishop at the end of the 5th century
Volusian of Tours, bishop from 491 to 498